Giessenlanden is a former municipality in the western Netherlands, in the province of South Holland. The municipality included communities of Arkel, Giessen-Oudekerk, Giessenburg, Hoogblokland, Hoornaar, Noordeloos and Schelluinen.

On 1 January 2019, it merged with Molenwaard to form the new municipality of Molenlanden.

Topography

Dutch topographic map of the municipality of Giessenlanden, June 2015

Public transportation
The Arkel railway station, on the Elst–Dordrecht railway, is situated in the municipality Giessenlanden.

References

External links
Official website

Molenlanden
Former municipalities of South Holland
1986 establishments in the Netherlands
States and territories established in 1986
Municipalities of the Netherlands disestablished in 2019